The International Radio A Class (RA) is a class of radio controlled sailing yacht used for competitive racing. It is a measurement controlled classes administered by the International Radio Sailing Association. The class is a designated IRSA International class entitled to hold World Championships officially recognised by the International Sailing Federation. A RA class of boat is a classic looking boat similar to that of the full sized metre class.  The RA class rules are loosely based on the 5.5 Metre. Modern boats use the latest carbon fibre technology with displacements typically between 13 – 16 kg, making them substantial yachts.

Events

World Championships

Unofficial World Championships
Unclear of the status of these events as the International Radio Sailing Association only joined ISAF in the mid-1990s.

External links
  International Radio Sailing Association Website
  ISAF A Class Microsite Website
 Uk A Class Series Blog Site

Classes of the International Radio Sailing Association
Keelboats
Development sailing classes